The Serbian Rugby League Cup is a rugby league competition, started in 2001.After three seasons, came a pause in the competitions for the Serbian Cup, because in the years of primal development, many foreign teams came to Serbia on a tour. Therefore, the place of the Serbian Cup was taken by the Serbian Rugby 13 Federation international Cup. In the 2008. season, Serbian Cup, as a domestic senior competition is again introduced into the calendar of R13FS, for the first time with seven teams and a quarter-finals phase.

2001

2005

2006

Tournament played between 28 April to 7 May.

2007

2008

2009

2010

2011

2012

2013

2014

2015

2016

2017

2018

2019

See also

List of rugby league competitions

References

External links
  

Rugby league in Serbia
European rugby league competitions